A composite bow is a traditional bow made from horn, wood, and sinew laminated together, a form of laminated bow. The horn is on the belly, facing the archer, and sinew on the outer side of a wooden core. When the bow is drawn, the sinew (stretched on the outside) and horn (compressed on the inside) store more energy than wood for the same length of bow. The strength can be made similar to that of all-wood "self" bows, with similar draw-length and therefore a similar amount of energy delivered to the arrow from a much shorter bow. However, making a composite bow requires more varieties of material than a self bow, its construction takes much more time, and the finished bow is more sensitive to moisture.

Archaeological finds and art indicate composite bows have existed since the second millennium BCE, but their history is not well recorded, being developed by cultures without a written tradition. They originated among Asiatic pastoralists who used them as daily necessities, classically for mounted archery, although they can also be used on foot. Such bows spread among the military (and hunters) of civilizations that came into contact with nomad tribes; composite bows have been used across Asia from Korea to the Atlantic coasts of Europe and North Africa, and southwards in the Arabian peninsula and in India. The use of horn in a bow was even remarked on in Homer's epic The Odyssey, believed to have been written in the 8th century BCE.

The details of manufacture varied between the various cultures that used them. Initially, the tips of the limbs were made to bend when the bow was drawn. Later, the tips were stiffened with bone or antler laths; post-classical bows usually have stiff tips, known as siyahs, which are made as an integral part of the wooden core of the bow.

Like other bows, they lost importance with the introduction and increasing accuracy of guns. In some areas, composite bows were still used and were further developed for leisure purposes. Early modern Turkish bows were specialized for flight archery (shooting for distance). Composite bows are still made and used in Korea and in China, and the tradition has been revived elsewhere. Modern replicas are available, often made with fiberglass bellies and backs with a natural or man-made core.

Construction and materials
The wooden core gives the bow its shape and dimensional stability. It is often made of multiple pieces, joined with animal glue in V-splices, so the wood must accept glue well. Pieced construction allows the sharp bends that many designs require, and the use of woods with different mechanical properties for the bending and nonbending sections.

The wood of the bending part of the limb ("dustar") must endure intense shearing stress, and denser woods such as hard maples are normally used in Turkish bows. Bamboo, and wood of the mulberry family, are traditional in China. Some composite bows have nonbending tips ("siyahs"), which need to be stiff and light; they may be made of woods such as Sitka spruce.

A thin layer of horn is glued onto what will be the belly of the bow, the side facing the archer. Water buffalo horn is very suitable, as is horn of several antelopes such as gemsbok, oryx, ibex, and that of Hungarian grey cattle. Goat and sheep horn can also be used. Most forms of cow horn are not suitable, as they soon delaminate with use. The horn can store more energy than wood in compression.

The sinew, soaked in animal glue, is then laid in layers on the back of the bow; the strands of sinew are oriented along the length of the bow. The sinew is normally obtained from the lower legs and back of wild deer or domestic ungulates. Traditionally, ox tendons are considered inferior to wild-game sinews since they have a higher fat content, leading to spoilage. Sinew has greater elastic tension properties than wood, again increasing the amount of energy that can be stored in the bow stave.

Hide glue or gelatin made from fish gas bladders is used to attach layers of sinew to the back of the bow, and to attach the horn belly to the wooden core.

Stiffening laths, if used, are attached. Both horn and laths may be bound and glued with further lengths of sinew. After months of drying, the bow is ready for use. Further finishing may include thin leather or waterproof bark, to protect the bow from moisture, and recent Turkish bows were often highly decorated with colourful paints and gold leaf.

Strings and arrows are essential parts of the weapon system, but no type of either is specifically associated with composite bows throughout their history.

Advantages and disadvantages of composite construction

Advantages
The main advantage of composite bows over self bows (made from a single piece of wood) is their combination of smaller size with high power. They are therefore more convenient than self bows when the archer is mobile, as from horseback, or from a chariot. Almost all composite bows are also recurve bows as the shape curves away from the archer; this design gives higher draw-weight in the early stages of the archer's draw, storing somewhat more total energy for a given final draw-weight. It would be possible to make a wooden bow that has the same shape, length, and draw-weight as a traditional composite bow, but it could not store the energy, and would break before full draw.

For most practical non-mounted archery purposes, composite construction offers no advantage; "the initial velocity is about the same for all types of bow... within certain limits, the design parameters... appear to be less important than is often claimed." However, they are superior for horsemen and in the specialized art of flight archery: "A combination of many technical factors made the composite flight bow better for flight shooting." The higher arrow velocity is only for well-designed composite bows of high draw-weight. At the weights more usual for modern amateurs, the greater density of horn and sinew compared with wood usually cancels any advantage.

Disadvantages
Constructing composite bows requires much more time and a greater variety of materials than self bows, and the animal glue used can lose strength in humid conditions; the 6th-century Byzantine military manual, the Strategikon, advised the cavalry of the Byzantine army, many of whom were armed with composite bows, to keep their bows in leather cases to keep them dry. Karpowicz suggests that crafting a composite bow may take a week's work, excluding drying time (months) and gathering materials, while a self bow can be made in a day and dried in a week. Peoples living in humid or rainy regions historically have favoured self bows, while those living in temperate, dry, or arid regions have favoured composite bows. 

Medieval Europeans favoured self bows as hand bows, but they made composite prods for crossbows. The prods were usually well protected from rain and humidity, which are prevalent in parts of Europe. Ancient Mediterranean civilizations, influenced by Eastern Archery, preferred composite recurve bows, and the Romans manufactured and used them as far north as Britannia.

The civilizations of India used both self bows and composite bows. The Mughals were especially known for their composite bows due to their Turko-Mongol roots.

The civilizations of China also used a combination of self bows, composite recurve bows, and laminated reflex bows. Self bows and laminated bows were preferred in southern China in earlier periods of history due to the region's extremely wet, humid, and rainy subtropical climate. The average rainfall in southern China exceeds , averaging  in many areas today.

Origins and use

Composite construction may have become common in the third or fourth millennium BCE, in Mesopotamia and Elam.

Associated with charioteers

Bows of any kind seldom survive in the archaeological record. Composite bows may have been invented first by the nomads of the Asiatic steppe, who may have based it on earlier Northern Asian laminated bows. However, archaeological investigation of the Asiatic steppe is still limited and patchy; literary records of any kind are late and scanty and seldom mention details of bows. There are arrowheads from the earliest chariot burials at Krivoye Lake, part of the Sintashta culture about 2100–1700 BCE, but the bow that shot them has not survived. Other sites of the Sintashta culture have produced finds of horn and bone, interpreted as furniture (grips, arrow rests, bow ends, string loops) of bows; there is no indication that the bending parts of these bows included anything other than wood. The Andronovo Culture, descendant of the Sintashta culture, was the first to extend from the Ural Mountains to Tian Shan, and its successor cultures gave rise to the Indo-Aryan migration. It has been suggested that the Srubna culture (contemporaneous with, and a neighbour to, the Andronovo culture) used composite bows, but no archaeological evidence is known.

Composite bows were soon adopted and adapted by civilizations who came into contact with nomads, such as the Chinese, Assyrians, and Egyptians. Several composite bows were found in the tomb of Tutankhamun, who died in 1324 BCE. Composite bows (and chariots) are known in China from at least the Shang Dynasty (1700–1100 BCE). There are strong indications that Greek Bronze Age cultures were using composite bows on a large scale. By the 4th century BCE, chariotry had ceased to have military importance, replaced by cavalry everywhere (except in Britannia, where charioteers are not recorded as using bows).

By mounted archers

The mounted archer became the archetypal warrior of the steppes and the composite bow was his primary weapon, used to protect the herds, in steppe warfare, and for incursions into settled lands.

Classic tactics for horse-mounted archers included skirmishing: they would approach, shoot, and retreat before any effective response could be made. The term Parthian shot refers to the widespread horse-archer tactic of shooting backwards over the rear of their horses as they retreated. Parthians inflicted heavy defeats on Romans, the first being the Battle of Carrhae. However, horse archers did not make an army invincible; Han General Ban Chao led successful military expeditions in the late 1st century CE that conquered as far as Central Asia, and both Philip of Macedon and his son Alexander the Great defeated horse archer armies. Well-led Roman armies defeated Parthian armies on several occasions and twice took the Parthian capital.

By infantry
Composite bows can be used without difficulty by infantry. The infantry archers of classical Greece and the Roman Empire used composite bows. The military of the Han Dynasty (220 BCE–206 CE) utilized composite crossbows, often in infantry square formations, in their many engagements against the Xiongnu. Until 1571, archers with composite bows were a main component of the forces of the Ottoman Empire, but in the Battle of Lepanto in that year, they lost most of these troops and never replaced them.

Technical changes in classical times
The details of bow construction changed somewhat with time. It is not clear that the various developments of the composite bow led to measurable improvements: "the development of archery equipment may not be a process involving progressive improvements in performance. Rather, each design type represents one solution to the problem of creating a mobile weapon system capable of hurling lightweight projectiles."

Scythian bows, bending tips

 Variants of the Scythian bow were the dominant form in Asia until approximately the first century BCE.

Siyahs, stiff tips
From about the 4th century BCE, the use of stiffened ends on composite bows became widespread. The stiffened end of the bow is a "siyah" (Arabic, Persian), "szarv" (Hungarian), "sarvi" (Finnish; both 'sarvi' and 'szarv' mean 'horn') or "kasan" (Turkish); the bending section is a "dustar" (Arabic), "lapa" (Finnish) or "sal" (Turkish). For centuries, the stiffening was accomplished by attaching laths of bone or antler to the sides of the bow at its ends. The bone or antler strips are more likely to survive burial than the rest of the bow. The first bone strips suitable for this purpose come from "graves of the fourth or third centuries" BCE. These stiffeners are found associated with nomads of the time. Maenchen-Helfen states that they are not found in Achaemenid Persia, in early Imperial Rome, or in Han China. However, Coulston attributes Roman stiffeners to about or before 9 CE. He identifies a Steppe Tradition of Scythian bows with working tips, which lasted, in Europe, until the arrival of the Huns, and a Near East or Levantine tradition with siyahs, possibly introduced by the Parni as siyahs are found in Sassanid but not Achaemenid contexts. Siyahs have also been described on the Arabian peninsula. Composite bows were adopted by the Roman Empire and were made even in the cold and damp of Britannia. They were the normal weapon of later Roman archers, both infantry and cavalry units (although Vegetius recommends training recruits "arcubus ligneis", with wooden bows).

Laths stiffening the grip
A new bow type, in which bone reinforcements cover the handle of the bow as well as the tips, may have developed in Central Asia during the 3rd to 2nd century BCE, with earliest finds from the area of Lake Baikal. Fittings from this type of bow appear right across Asia from Korea to the Crimea. Such bows with reinforcement of both grip and siyahs have been called “Hun,” "Hunnic", or “Hsiung-nu” composite bows. Huns did use such bows, but so did many other peoples; Rausing termed this type the 'Qum-Darya Bow' from the Han Chinese-type site at the frontier post of Loulan, at the mouth of the Qum Darya river, dated by analogy between c. 1st century BCE and the 3rd century CE.

With the arrival of the Huns, this tradition of bows with stiffened grips came to Europe. "Alanic graves in the Volga region dating to the 3rd to 4th century CE signal the adoption of the Qum-Darya type by Sarmatian peoples from Hunnic groups advancing from the East. In general, Hunnic/Qum-Darya bows had two pairs of ear laths identical in every respect to those found on Roman limes sites. The ear laths show only a greater proportion of longer laths (like those of Roman examples from Bar Hill and London). More distinctively, the grip of the bow was stiffened by three laths. On the sides were glued a pair of trapezoidal laths with their longest edges towards the back. On the belly was glued a third lath, varying in shape but often narrow with parallel sides and splayed ends. Therefore, each bow possessed seven grip and ear laths, compared with none on the Scythian and Sarmatian bows and four (ear) laths on the Yrzi bow."

Such bows were often asymmetric, with lower limbs shorter than the upper.

The Huns and their successors greatly impressed their neighbours with their archery. Germanic tribes transmitted their respect orally for a millennium: in the Scandinavian Hervarar saga, the Geatish king Gizur taunts the Huns and says, "Eigi gera Húnar oss felmtraða né hornbogar yðrir." (We fear neither the Huns nor their hornbows.) The Romans, as described in the Strategikon, Procopius's histories, and other works, changed the entire emphasis of their army from heavy infantry to cavalry, many of them armed with bows. Maurikios's Strategikon describes the Byzantine cavalry as bow-armed cursores and lance-armed defensores.

Additional stiffening laths
The Qum-Darya bow was superseded in the modern area of Hungary by an 'Avar' type, with more and differently-shaped laths. The grip laths stayed essentially the same except that a fourth piece was sometimes glued to the back of the handle, enclosing it with bone on all four faces. The belly lath was often parallel-sided with splayed ends. The siyah laths became much wider in profile above the nock and less rounded, giving a bulbous aspect. The nock was often further away from the upper end of the siyah than on Qum-Darya type examples. Additional laths were usually added to the belly and back of the siyah, thus enclosing both ends of the stave on four faces. This made a total of up to 12 laths on an asymmetrical bow with a stiff, set-back handle. When unstrung, the siyahs reversed sharply forward at an angle of 50-60 degrees.

Post-classical development
After the fall of the Western Roman Empire, armies of the Byzantine Empire maintained their tradition of horse archery for centuries. Byzantium finally fell to the Turks before the decline of military archery in favour of guns. Turkish armies included archers until about 1591 (they played a major role in the Battle of Lepanto (1571), and flight archery remained a popular sport in Istanbul until the early 19th century. Most surviving documentation of the use and construction of composite bows comes from China and the Middle East; until reforms early in the 20th century, skill with the composite bow was an essential part of the qualification for officers in the Chinese Imperial army. 

The composite bow was adopted throughout the Arab world, even though some Bedu tribesmen in the Hijaz retained the use of simple self bows. Persian designs were used after the conquest of the Sassanid Empire, and Turkish-type bows were widely used after the Turkic expansions. Roughly speaking, Arabs favoured slightly shorter siyahs and broader limbs than the Indo-Persian designs. Sometimes, the protective cover on the back was painted with Arabic calligraphy or geometric patterns. No design was standardized over the vast area of the Arab conquests. It was said that the best Arab composite bows were manufactured in Damascus, Syria.

The first surviving treatise on composite bow construction and archery was written in Arabic under Mamluk rule about 1368. Fragments of bone laths from composite bows were found among grave goods in the United Arab Emirates dating from the period between 100 BC and 150 AD.

Integral wooden siyahs
Later developments in the composite bow included siyahs made of separate pieces of wood, attached with a V-splice to the wooden core of the bow, rather than strengthened by external reinforcement. Medieval and modern bows generally have integral wooden siyahs and lack stiffening laths.

String bridges
A string "bridge" or "run" is an attachment of horn or wood, used to hold the string a little further apart from the bow's limbs at the base of the siyahs, as well as allowing the siyah to rest at an angle forward of the string. This attachment may add weight, but might give a small increase in the speed of the arrow by increasing the initial string angle and therefore the force of the draw in its early stages. Large string bridges are characteristic of Manchu (Qing dynasty, 1644–1911) bows and late Mongolian bows, while small string bridges are characteristic of Korean, Crimean Tatar, and some Ming dynasty (1368–1644) bows. String bridges are not present in artwork in the time of Genghis Khan or before.

Modern living traditions of composite bows
All Eurasian composite bows derive from the same nomad origins, but every culture that used them has made its own adaptations to the basic design. The Turkish, Mongolian, and Korean bows were standardized when archery lost its military function and became a popular sport. Recent Turkish bows are optimized for flight shooting.

Perso-Parthian bow
The Perso-Parthian bow is a symmetric recurve under high tension when strung. The "arms" of the bow are supposed to reflex far enough to cross each other when the bow is unstrung. The finished bow is covered by bark, fine leather, or in some cases shark skin to keep out moisture.

Perso-Parthian bows were in use as late as the 1820s in Persia (ancient Iran). They were then replaced by muskets.

Turkish bow

This is the Ottoman development of the composite bow, presumably brought from the steppes. Turkish bows evolved, after the decline of military archery, into probably the best traditional flight bows. Their decoration often included delicate and beautiful multicoloured designs with gold.

Chinese bow

For millennia, archery has played a pivotal role in Chinese history. Because the cultures associated with Chinese society spanned a wide geography and time range, the techniques and equipment associated with Chinese archery are diverse. Historical sources and archaeological evidence suggest that a variety of bow designs existed throughout Chinese history. For much of the 20th century, only a few Chinese traditional bow and arrow-making workshops were active. However, in the beginning of the 21st century, there has been a revival in interest among craftsmen looking to construct bows and arrows in the traditional Chinese style.

Mongol bow

The Mongolian tradition of archery is attested by an inscription on a stone stele that was found near Nerchinsk in Siberia: "While Genghis Khan was holding an assembly of Mongolian dignitaries, after his conquest of Sartaul (Khwarezm), Yesüngge (the son of Genghis Khan's younger brother) shot a target at 335 alds (536 m)". The Mongol bowmaking tradition was lost under the Qing, who heavily restricted archery practice; only practice with blunt arrows at shorted distances was allowed while most other forms of practice, including mounted archery; was forbidden. The present bowmaking tradition emerged after independence in 1921 and is based on Manchu types of bow. Mounted archery had fallen into disuse and has been revived only in the 21st century.

Archery with composite bows is part of the annual festival of the three virile sports (wrestling, horseriding, archery), called "Naadam".

Hungarian bow
The Hungarian bow is a fairly long, approximately symmetrical composite reflex bow with bone stiffeners. Its shape is known from two graves in which the position of the bone plates could be reconstructed. Modern Hungarians have attempted to reconstruct the composite bows of their ancestors and have revived mounted archery as a competitive sport.

Korean bow

A traditional Korean bow, or gakgung, is a small but very efficient horn-bamboo-sinew composite bow. Korean archers normally practice at a range of approximately 145 metres.

Japanese bow

Yumi is made by laminating multiple pieces of bamboo and wood.

Analogous New World bows, modern replicas, alternative materials

American sinew-backed bows
When Europeans first contacted Native Americans, some bows, especially in the area that became California, already had sinew backing. After the introduction of domesticated horses, newly mounted groups rapidly developed shorter bows, which were often given sinew backing. The full three-layer composite bow with horn, wood, and sinew does not seem to be recorded in the Americas, and horn bows with sinew backing are not recorded before European contact.

Replicas made with modern materials
Modern replicas of traditional composite bows are commercially available; they are usually made with fibreglass or carbon on both belly and back, easier to mass-produce and easier to take care of than traditional composite bows.

Other less satisfactory materials than horn have been used for the belly of the bow (the part facing the archer when shooting), including bone, antler, or compression-resistant woods such as osage orange, hornbeam, or yew. Materials that are strong under tension, such as silk, or tough wood, like hickory, have been used on the back of the bow (the part facing away from the archer when shooting).

See also

Bow construction techniques

Popular Culture
 Avatar: The Legend of Aang features composite bows being used by Yuyan Archers including Vachir of the Rough Rhinos.
 The 1998 film of Mulan and its 2020 reboot features composite bows used by Mulan's forces and their enemies.
 Deadliest Warriors features composite bows used by Attila the Hun when fighting Alexander the Great and a Persian Immortal when fighting a Celtic warrior.

References

External links
 The Asian Traditional Archery Research network
 The building process of a Manchu composite bow
 Ancient Composite Bows
 Making an Asiatic Composite Bow
 Five composite bows from the tomb of Tutankhamun

Bows (archery)